Manfred Zapatka (born 2 October 1942 in Bremen, Germany) is a German actor.

Early life
Zapatka completed his abitur at Clemens-August-Gymnasium in Cloppenburg in 1962.

Selected filmography
1964: 
1978: Germany in Autumn (Deutschland im Herbst)
1980: Derrick - Season 7, Episode 7: "Der Tod sucht Abonnenten" (TV)
1982: War and Peace
1983: Utopia (at the 33rd Berlin International Film Festival)
1988: Derrick - Season 15, Episode 12: "Eine Art Mord" (TV)
1989:  (The Officer Factory, TV miniseries)
1989: Rivalen der Rennbahn (TV series, 11 episodes)
1990: Der Absturz a.k.a. Der Rausschmeißer (TV film)
1991:  (TV film)
1991: Success
1993: The Last U-Boat (TV film)
1993:  (TV miniseries)
1993: 
1995: The Public Prosecutor (TV film)
1997:   (TV film)
1998: Frankfurt Millennium (TV film)
2000:  (Erkan & Stefan the Bunnyguards)
2000: 
2001: 
2002: Elefantenherz
2003: Tatort:  (TV)
2003: Der Puppengräber (TV film)
2004:  (Nightsongs, at the 54th Berlin International Film Festival)
2004: Rosa Roth: Freundeskreis (TV)
2005:  (TV film)
2005: Mord am Meer (TV film)
2005: Falscher Bekenner (I Am Guilty)
2006: Der freie Wille (The Free Will)
2006: Offset
2006: Eden
2006: 
2007-2010: KDD – Kriminaldauerdienst (TV series, 27 episodes)
2007: Autopilots
2008:  (TV film)
2008: Die Lüge (TV film)
2010:  (TV film)
2011:  (TV film)
2014:  (TV film)
2019: All My Loving
2019: The Collini Case (Der Fall Collini)

External links

Hübchen Agency Berlin 

1942 births
Living people
Actors from Bremen
People from Cloppenburg
German male television actors
German male film actors
20th-century German male actors
21st-century German male actors